The Niederschlesischer Oberlausitzkreis (German for district of Lower Silesian Upper Lusatia) was the easternmost Kreis (district) of Saxony and Germany. Neighboring districts were (from south clockwise) Löbau-Zittau, Bautzen, Kamenz and the district Spree-Neiße in Brandenburg. The urban district Görlitz was in the east, at the border to Poland.

History 
The territory of this district was not part of Saxony before World War II; rather, it, along with the city of Görlitz, was a part of German Silesia.  When most of Silesia was assigned to Poland after the war, the tiny rump of the Silesian province was integrated into Saxony.

The current district was formed in 1994 by merging the previous districts Niesky and Weißwasser, and most part of the former district Görlitz. In August 2008, it became a part of the new district of Görlitz.

Geography 
The main river in the district is the Neisse, which also forms the boundary to Poland. The terrain is mostly hilly, with broad valleys. In the past many swamps covered the area, which is now heath areas and many ponds.

Partnerships 
Neustadt an der Waldnaab
Schwandorf
Zarski (Poland)
Semily (Czech Republic)

Coat of arms

Towns and municipalities
{|
! align=left width=33%|Towns
! align=left width=33%|Municipalities
! align=left width=33%|
|- valign=top
||
Bad Muskau
Niesky
Reichenbach/O.L.
Rothenburg/O.L.
Weißwasser
||
Boxberg
Gablenz
Groß Düben
Hähnichen
Hohendubrau
Horka
Klitten
Kodersdorf
Königshain
Krauschwitz
Kreba-Neudorf
Markersdorf
||
 Mücka
 Neißeaue
 Quitzdorf am See
 Rietschen
 Schleife
 Schöpstal
 Sohland am Rotstein
 Trebendorf
 Vierkirchen
 Waldhufen
 Weißkeißel
|}

External links
Official website (German)

Görlitz (district)
History of Lower Silesia